Archbishop Thomas Ignatius Macwan is the current archbishop of the Roman Catholic Archdiocese of Gandhinagar.

Early life 
He was born on 14 October 1952 in Bhavnagar, Gujarat.

Priesthood 
He was ordained a Catholic priest on 9 April 1988.

Episcopate 
He was appointed Bishop of the Roman Catholic Diocese of Ahmedabad on 11 November 2002 and ordained Bishop on 11 January 2003. He was appointed Archbishop of Roman Catholic Archdiocese of Gandhinagar on 12 June 2015 and installed on 12 September 2015 by Pope Francis.

Controversy 

During the 2017 campaign for Gujarat Assembly elections, Archbishop MacWan issued a letter to the Christian community suggesting that they pray for the election of "humane leaders", to "save" India "from nationalist forces". The Legal Rights Observatory lodged a complaint with the Election Commission of India against the archbishop. The Election Commission served a notice to the archbishop, asking for an explanation.

References

External links

Living people
21st-century Roman Catholic archbishops in India
1952 births
People from Bhavnagar